The Landon Donovan MVP Award is an annual award for Major League Soccer players. It is voted on by media, MLS players, and club management and is given to the player deemed the most valuable player in the league each season.

From 1996 to 2007, the award was known as the Honda MLS Most Valuable Player, for commercial purposes. From 2007 to 2014, the award was titled the Volkswagen MLS Most Valuable Player.

Players for D.C. United have won the award a record four times, while Kansas City and Los Angeles Galaxy players have won a second best three times. Kansas City's Preki is the only player to ever win twice, in 1997 and 2003.

On January 15, 2015, MLS renamed its MVP award in honor of Landon Donovan.

Winners

See also
Best MLS Player ESPY Award

References

MVP
1996 establishments in the United States
Awards established in 1996
Annual events in the United States
Major League Soccer